This list comprises sportspeople originally from Fiji, as well as some expatriates who play for or coach Fijian teams.  The term Fijian is used here in a national, rather than ethnic, sense. Noa Nadruku was the first Fijian to play rugby league in the NRL. He played in the 1980s and 1990s for Canberra Raiders and the North Queensland Cowboys after switching from rugby union.

Australian rules footballers
 Alipate Carlile (born 30 April 1987)
 David Rodan (born 8 October 1983)
 Nic Naitanui (born 4 May 1990)

Cricketers 
 William Apted (born 1930)
 I. L. Bula (1921–?).

Football 

 Krishna, Roy.
 Masi, Esala.
 Hughes, Setareki.

Golfers 

 Chand, Dinesh.
 Singh, Vijay (born 22 February 1963).

Rugby League players 
 Bukuya, Jason.
 Civoniceva, Petero.
 Groom, Aaron. 
 Hayne, Jarryd.
 Koroibete, Marika.
 Koroisau, Apisai.
 Nabuli, Eto. 
 Naiqama, Wes.
 Naiqama, Kevin.
 Naulu, Samueli.
 Radradra, Semi.
 Sims, Ashton. 
 Sims, Tariq. 
 Sims, Korbin. 
 Tagive, Peni.* Waqa, Sisa. 
 Tadulala, Semi.
 Uate, Akuila.

NFL players 

Singh, Bobby (born November 21, 1975). 
Keiaho, Freddy (born December 18, 1982). 
Luvu, Frankie (born September 19, 1996).

Rugby union players 

 Bobo, Sireli (born 28 January 1976).
 Bolavucu, Filimoni (born 13 February 1981).
 Ram, Jack (born January 14, 1987).
 Caucaunibuca, Rupeni (born 5 June 1980).
 Daunivucu, Jone (born 1 June 1977).
 Delasau, Vilimoni (born 12 July 1977).
 Doviverata, Ro Alifereti (born 14 June 1976).
 Gaunavou, Maseikula 
 Kunavore, Maleli (born 13 November 1983).
 Ligairi, Norman
 Little, Nicky
 Lotawa, Watisone (born 13 July 1979)
 Luveitasau, Mosese (born 23 March 1980).
 Nabuliwaqa, Lepani (born 4 June 1980).
 Nacewa, Isa
 Naevo, Apenisa (born 24 February 1973).
 Naevo, Semisi (born 3 May 1976).
 Nanuku, Neumi
 Naqelevuki, Sireli
 Pivac, Wayne, coach.
 Qera, Akapusi (b. April 24, 1984).
 Rabeni, Seru
 Radaveta, Kiniviliame (born 17 March 1975).
 Rauluni, Moses
 Rawaqa, Ifereimi (born 20 September 1980).
 Roko, Nasoni (born 29 November 1979).
 Ryder, William (born 1982).
 Satala, Viliame (born 19 July 1972).
 Serevi, Waisale (born 20 May 1968).
 Simpson, Nigel (born 25 April 1975).
 Sivivatu, Sitiveni (born 19 April 1982).
 Tabua, Ilivasi, coach.
 Tadulala, Semi
 Tuqiri, Lote, (born 23 September 1979).
Valetini, Rob (born 3 September 1998).
 Vidiri, Joeli, (born 23 November 1973).
 Volavola, Mosese
 Vunibaka, Marika (born 3 November 1974).
 Waqaseduadua, Viliame (born 23 April 1982).

Swimmers
 Rachel Ah Koy (b. May 31, 1989)
 Carl Probert
 Caroline Pickering Puamau
Sharon Pickering Smith
Taichi Vakasama

Boxers
 Sailosi Vatubua - Represented Fiji in amateur boxing and won the gold medal at the 1966 South Pacific Games.
 Renold Quinlan

Wrestlers 
 Snuka, Jimmy (born 18 May 1943).
 Snuka, Jimmy Jr.
 Snuka, Tamina.

Windsurfers 
 Tony Philp

Miscellaneous sportspeople 

Boyer, Derek, Fiji-born Australian strongman.
 Davu, Vilimaina, Fiji-born New Zealand netball and basketball player.
 Delai, Jone, track and field athlete
 Elder, Rob, archer.
 Evans, Ivor, former Vancouver 86ers footballer.
 Lal, John Icha, footballer.
 Maharaj, J.D. (died 2006), sports administrator.
 Maraia Lum On, three times World Bowls silver medallist

 
Fijian